Raymond Octave Joseph Barre (12 April 192425 August 2007) was a French centre-right politician and economist. He was a Vice President of the European Commission and Commissioner for Economic and Financial Affairs under three presidents (Rey, Malfatti and Mansholt) and later served as Prime Minister under Valéry Giscard d'Estaing from 1976 until 1981. As a candidate for the presidency in 1988, he came in third and was eliminated in the first round. He was born in Saint-Denis, on the French island of Réunion, and then still a colony (it became an overseas department in 1946).

Career

Professional life
After his education, Raymond Barre was a professor of economics at the Institut d'Etudes Politiques de Paris (Sciences Po) as well as École Centrale Paris.

From 1959 to 1962, he was director of Jean-Marcel Jeanneney's staff in the ministry of Industry and Trade. Then, in 1967, President Charles de Gaulle chose him as Vice-President of the European Commission for Economic & Financial Affairs. He stayed in Brussels until January 1973, serving in the Rey, Malfatti and Mansholt Commissions. Having come back to France, he joined the cabinet as minister of External Trade in January 1976.

Premiership
Seven months later, while mostly unknown at that time, President Giscard d'Estaing appointed him Prime Minister and Minister of Economy and Finance. He presented him to the French people as "the best economist in France". Under the Fifth Republic, he was the only person to hold these two offices at the same time. He left the ministry of Economy and Finance in 1978 but stayed as Prime minister until the defeat of Giscard d'Estaing at the 1981 presidential election.

At the head of the cabinet, he was faced with the conflict which divided the parliamentary majority between the "Giscardians" and the neo-Gaullist Rally for the Republic (RPR) led by his predecessor Jacques Chirac. The right majority unexpectedly won the 1978 legislative election.

Barre was primarily confronted with an economic crisis. He advocated numerous complex, strict policies ("Barre Plans"). The first Barre plan emerged on 22 September 1976, with a priority to stop inflation. It included a 3-month price freeze; a reduction in the value-added tax; wage controls; salary controls; a reduction of the growth in the money supply; and increases in the income tax, automobile taxes, luxury taxes and bank rates. There were measures to restore the trade balance and support the growth of the economy and employment. Oil imports, whose price had shot up, were limited. There was special aid to exports, and an action fund was set up to aid industries. There was increased financial aid to farmers, who were suffering from a drought, and for social security. The package was not very popular but was pursued with vigor.

In the face of trade union opposition, he did not use diplomatic language. Instead, he mocked "the bearers of banners" and he exhorted "instead of grousing, you should work hard".

Post-premiership
After he departed from the head of the cabinet, he was elected deputy of Rhône département under the label of the Union for French Democracy (UDF), although he never formally joined the party. He held his parliamentary seat until 2002.

In the 1980s, he competed for the leadership of the right against Chirac. Believing that the "cohabitation" was incompatible with the "Fifth Republic", he let Chirac take the lead of the cabinet after the 1986 legislative election. He ran as UDF candidate for president in the 1988 election, but some components of his party supported covertly the other right-wing candidate, the Neo-Gaullist Prime Minister Jacques Chirac. In this, in spite of positive polls at the beginning of the campaign, he came third behind the two protagonists of the "cohabitation": the Socialist President François Mitterrand and Jacques Chirac. For the second round, he called his voters to transfer to the RPR candidate, who was finally defeated.

After the failure of his presidential candidacy, he focused on his local tenures, in Lyon. In 1995, the RPR Mayor of Lyon Michel Noir could not compete for another term due to a judicial indictment, and consequently, Barre was the conservative candidate for the mayoralty. He was elected but he did not run for a second term in 2001. One year later, he finished his last parliamentary term in the French National Assembly and retired from politics.

Raymond Barre was probably the only French politician to have reached such high levels of responsibilities without having ever been an official member or leader of any political party. He always kept some distance with what he considered to be the political "microcosm".

Raymond Barre died on 25 August 2007 at age 83 at the Val-de-Grâce military hospital in Paris, where he was being treated for heart problems since his transfer from a hospital in Monaco on 11 April 2007.

Political career

Governmental functions

Prime minister : 1976–1981.

Minister of Economy and Finance : 1976–1978.

Minister of Foreign Trade : January–August 1976.

Electoral mandates

National Assembly of France

Member of the National Assembly of France for Rhône (department) : 1981–2002. Elected in 1981, reelected in 1986, 1988, 1993, 1997.

Municipal Council

Mayor of Lyon : 1995–2001.

Municipal councillor of Lyon : 1995–2001.

Urban community Council

President of the Urban Community of Lyon : 1995–2001.

Member of the Urban Community of Lyon : 1995–2001.

Bilderberg Conference participant 1983

Allegations of antisemitism

On several occasions, Raymond Barre made remarks that were interpreted as antisemitic, or at least supportive of antisemitism. In 1980, when he was prime minister, a bombing was attempted against the Union Libérale Israélite de France, a synagogue in the rue Copernic, Paris; however the bomb detonated in the street when the Jews attending shabbat were inside the synagogue, and not when they were out; but as a result some non-Jewish bystanders were killed. Raymond Barre then famously denounced:

"A hateful attack which wanted to strike at the Jews who were in that synagogue, and which struck innocent French people who were crossing the street."

In 2007, Barre argued on a radio show that "the Jewish lobby" had orchestrated criticism regarding his 1980 remarks. On this same show, Barre defended the collaborationist Maurice Papon at his trial, describing him as "a scapegoat." Barre was criticized for these remarks.

Governments

Barre's First Government, 25 August 1976 – 30 March 1977
Raymond Barre – Prime Minister and Minister of Economy and Finance
Louis de Guiringaud – Minister of Foreign Affairs
Yvon Bourges – Minister of Defense
Michel Poniatowski – Minister of the Interior
Michel d'Ornano – Minister of Industry and Research
Christian Beullac – Minister of Labour
Olivier Guichard – Minister of Justice
René Haby – Minister of Education
Christian Bonnet – Minister of Agriculture
Jean-Pierre Fourcade – Minister of Equipment
Robert Boulin – Minister of Relations with Parliament
Simone Veil – Minister of Health
Robert Galley – Minister of Cooperation
Pierre Brousse – Minister of Commerce and Craft Industry
André Rossi – Minister of External Commerce
Vincent Ansquer – Minister of Quality of Life
Jean Lecanuet – Minister of Planning

Barre's Second Government, 30 March 1977 – 5 April 1978
Raymond Barre – Prime Minister and Minister of Economy and Finance
Louis de Guiringaud – Minister of Foreign Affairs
Yvon Bourges – Minister of Defense
Christian Bonnet – Minister of the Interior
René Monory – Minister of Industry, Commerce, and Craft Industry
Christian Beullac – Minister of Labour
Alain Peyrefitte – Minister of Justice
René Haby – Minister of Education
Michel d'Ornano – Minister of Culture and Environment
Pierre Méhaignerie – Minister of Agriculture
Jean-Pierre Fourcade – Minister of Equipment and Regional Planning
Simone Veil – Minister of Health and Social Security
Robert Galley – Minister of Cooperation
André Rossi – Minister of External Commerce

Changes
26 September 1977 – Fernand Icart succeeds Fourcade as Minister of Equipment and Regional Planning.

Barre's Third Government, 5 April 1978 – 21 May 1981
Raymond Barre – Prime Minister
Louis de Guiringaud – Minister of Foreign Affairs
Yvon Bourges – Minister of Defense
Christian Bonnet – Minister of the Interior
René Monory – Minister of Economy
Maurice Papon – Minister of Budget
André Giraud – Minister of Industry
Robert Boulin – Minister of Labour and Participation
Alain Peyrefitte – Minister of Justice
Christian Beullac – Minister of Education
Alice Saunier-Seïté – Minister of Universities
Jean-Philippe Lecat – Minister of Culture and Communication
Pierre Méhaignerie – Minister of Agriculture
Michel d'Ornano – Minister of Environment and Quality of Life
Jean-Pierre Soisson – Minister of Youth, Sports, and Leisure
Fernand Icart – Minister of Equipment and Regional Planning
Joël Le Theule – Minister of Transport
Simone Veil – Minister of Health and Family
Robert Galley – Minister of Cooperation
Jacques Barrot – Minister of Commerce and Craft Industry
Jean-François Deniau – Minister of External Commerce

Changes
29 November 1978 – Jean François-Poncet succeeds Guiringaud as Minister of Foreign Affairs.
4 July 1979 – Jacques Barrot succeeds Veil as Minister of Health and Social Security. Maurice Charretier succeeds Barrot as Minister of Commerce and Craft Industry.
29 October 1979 – Jean Mattéoli succeeds Boulin as Minister of Labour and Participation.
2 October 1980 – Joël Le Theule succeeds Bourges as Minister of Defense. Daniel Hoeffel succeeds Le Theule as Minister of Transport. Michel Cointat succeeds Deniau as Minister of External Commerce.
22 December 1980 – Robert Galley succeeds Le Theule (d.14 December) as Minister of Defense.
4 March 1981 – Michel d'Ornano succeeds Lecat as Minister of Culture. No one succeeds Lecat as Minister of Communication.

Retirement
Barre retired from active politics in June 2002. He was being treated at a hospital for a heart condition since April 2007 when he died on 25 August 2007. He was survived by his wife and two sons.

Honours

French Honours
 Grand Cross of the National Order of Merit 
 Commander of the Order of Merit for Commerce and Industry
 Officier of the Legion of Honour 
 Officier of the Ordre des Palmes académiques 
 Knight of the Order of Agricultural Merit

Foreign Honours
  : Grand Officer	of the Order of Ouissam Alaouite
  : Officier of the National Order of Quebec 
  : Knight Grand Cross of the Order of Isabella the Catholic
  : Grand Cordon of the Order of the Republic

Works
 La Période dans l'analyse économique – une approche à l'étude du temps, SEDEIS, 1950
 Économie politique, Paris, Presses universitaires de France, Thémis économie, 1959
 Le Développement économique : analyse et politique, 1958
 Une politique pour l'avenir, Plon, 1981
 La Désinflation, Paris, Que sais-je ?, 1983
 Un plan pour l'Europe – la Communauté européenne, problèmes et perspectives, Presses universitaires de Nancy, 1984
 Réflexions pour demain, 1984, Pluriel 
 Au tournant du siècle, Plon, 1988
 Questions de confiance – Entretiens avec Jean-Marie Colombani, Flammarion, 1988
 Entretiens, collectif, 2001
 L'Expérience du pouvoir, conversations avec Jean Bothorel, Fayard, 2007 .

References

Further reading
 Bell, David et al. eds. Biographical Dictionary of French Political Leaders Since 1870 (1990) pp 18–20.
 Bell, David. Presidential Power in Fifth Republic France (2000) passim.
 Frears, J. R. France in the Giscard Presidency (1981) passim.
 Ryan, W. Francis. "France under Giscard" Current History (May 1981) 80#466, pp. 201–6, online.

External links 

 

|-

|-

|-

|-

|-

|-

|-

1924 births
2007 deaths
People from Saint-Denis, Réunion
Politicians of Réunion
Union for French Democracy politicians
Prime Ministers of France
French Ministers of Finance
Deputies of the 6th National Assembly of the French Fifth Republic
Deputies of the 7th National Assembly of the French Fifth Republic
Deputies of the 8th National Assembly of the French Fifth Republic
Deputies of the 9th National Assembly of the French Fifth Republic
Deputies of the 10th National Assembly of the French Fifth Republic
Deputies of the 11th National Assembly of the French Fifth Republic
Mayors of Lyon
Candidates in the 1988 French presidential election
French European Commissioners
French economists
Sciences Po alumni
Officers of the National Order of Quebec
Burials at Montparnasse Cemetery
European Commissioners 1967–1970
European Commissioners 1970–1972
European Commissioners 1972–1973